William Bruce Hale (August 30, 1918 – December 30, 1980) was an American professional basketball player and coach.

A 6'1" guard/forward from Medford, Oregon, Hale played college basketball at Santa Clara University, then played professionally in the early NBA as a member of the Indianapolis Jets, Fort Wayne Pistons, and Indianapolis Olympians. He averaged 9.1 points per game over his NBA career. He later held coaching positions with the University of Miami, the Oakland Oaks of the American Basketball Association, and St. Mary's College of California. With Miami, he took the program to their first NCAA Division I men's basketball tournament in 1960, which would be the last for the program for 38 years. Before he died of a heart attack in 1980, he had been working as a marketing director at the KNBR radio station.

Hale's daughter, Pam, married basketball player Rick Barry, who played for Hale at the University of Miami.  Through Pam, Hale is the grandfather of NBA players Brent Barry, Jon Barry, and Drew Barry.

Hale was inducted into the University of Miami Sports Hall of Fame in 1986.

BAA/NBA career statistics

Regular season

Playoffs

Head coaching record

References

External links

1918 births
1980 deaths
All-American college men's basketball players
American men's basketball players
Basketball coaches from Oregon
Basketball players from Oregon
Chicago American Gears players
College men's basketball head coaches in the United States
Fort Wayne Pistons players
Forwards (basketball)
Guards (basketball)
Indianapolis Jets coaches
Indianapolis Jets players
Indianapolis Kautskys players
Indianapolis Olympians players
Miami Hurricanes men's basketball coaches
Oakland Oaks coaches
Player-coaches
Professional Basketball League of America players
Saint Mary's Gaels men's basketball coaches
Santa Clara Broncos men's basketball players
Sportspeople from Medford, Oregon
Undrafted National Basketball Association players